The Balkan Turks or Rumelian Turks are the Turkish people who have been living in the Balkans since the Ottoman rule as well as their descendants who still live in the region today. The Turks are officially recognized as a minority in Bosnia and Herzegovina, Bulgaria, Croatia, Kosovo, North Macedonia, and Romania; in Greece the Turkish minority is recognized as "Greek Muslims". Furthermore, the Turkish language has minority language status in Bosnia and Herzegovina, North Macedonia, and Romania. The Ottoman Empire conquered parts of the Balkans between the 14th and 16th century.

Historically, from the Ottoman conquest up to and including the 19th century, ethnically non-Turkish, especially South Slavic Muslims of the Balkans were referred to in the local languages as Turks (term for Muslims). This usage is common in literature, for example in the works of Ivan Mažuranić and Petar II Petrović-Njegoš. However, during the 20th century it gradually fell out of favour. Today, the largest mainly Muslim Slavic ethnic group is known as the Bosniaks.

See also

 Turkish population
Muhacirs
Turks in Europe

References

Bibliography

 Sosyal, Levent (2011), "Turks", in Cole, Jeffrey, Ethnic Groups of Europe: An Encyclopedia, ABC-CLIO, .
 Republic of Macedonia State Statistical Office (2005), Republic of Macedonia – State Statistical Office, Republic of Macedonia – State Statistical Office
 Abrahams, Fred (1996), A Threat to "Stability": Human Rights Violations in Macedonia, Human Rights Watch, .
 Evans, Thammy (2010), Macedonia, Bradt Travel Guides, .
 Phinnemore, David (2006), The EU and Romania: Accession and Beyond, The Federal Trust for Education & Research, .
 Constantin, Daniela L.; Goschin, Zizi; Dragusin, Mariana (2008), "Ethnic entrepreneurship as an integration factor in civil society and a gate to religious tolerance. A spotlight on Turkish entrepreneurs in Romania", Journal for the Study of Religions and Ideologies 7 (20): 28–41.
 Whitman, Lois (1990), Destroying ethnic identity: the Turks of Greece, Human Rights Watch, .
 Clogg, Richard (2002), Minorities in Greece, Hurst & Co. Publishers, .

Ethnic groups in the Balkans
Turkish diaspora in Europe